In probability theory and Bayesian statistics, the Lewandowski-Kurowicka-Joe distribution, often referred to as the LKJ distribution, is a continuous probability distribution for a symmetric matrix. It is commonly used as a prior for correlation or covariance matrices in hierarchical Bayesian modelling. In hierarchical Bayesian modelling it is common to include in the model a covariance structure for the data; one of the goals of the Bayesian model will be to estimate a posterior distribution for this covariance; for this to work a prior distribution is needed for the covariance matrix, this is commonly provided by the LKJ distribution. The distribution was first introduced in a more general context  and is an example of the vine copula, an approach to constrained high-dimensional probability distributions. It has been implemented as part of the Stan probabilistic programming language and as a library linked to the turing.jl probabilistic programming library in Julia.

The distribution has a single shape parameter  and the probability mass function for a matrix  is

which hides the normalization factor, a complicated expression including a product over Beta functions. For  the distribution is uniform over all symmetric positive definite matrices.

References

External links 

 Described as part of the STAN manual
 distribution-explorer

Random matrices
Bayesian statistics
Continuous distributions
Multivariate continuous distributions